James 'Jim' A. Dunnigan (born March 31, 1953) is an American politician serving as a member of the Utah House of Representatives for the 39th district. Elected in November 2002, he assumed office on January 1, 2003.

Early life and education
Dunnigan was born March 31, 1953, in Salt Lake City. He earned a Bachelor of Arts degree in business management from the University of Utah.

Career
Outside of politics, Dunnigan owns an insurance agency. He served as a member of the Taylorsville/Bennion Community Council and Taylorsville City Council.

Dunnigan was elected to the Utah House of Representatives in November 2002 and assumed office on January 1, 2003. During the 2016 general session Dunnigan served as House's majority leader.

Personal life 
He currently lives in Taylorsville, Utah with his wife Vicki and two children.

References

External links
 Official page  at the Utah State Legislature
 Official Campaign Website
 Jim Dunnigan at Ballotpedia
 Jim Dunnigan at OpenSecrets

1953 births
Living people
Republican Party members of the Utah House of Representatives
Politicians from Salt Lake City
People from Taylorsville, Utah
University of Utah alumni
21st-century American politicians